Dəmirçi (also, Damerchi and Demirchi) is a village and municipality in the Shamakhi Rayon of Azerbaijan.  It has a population of 891.  The municipality consists of the villages of Dəmirçi, Zarat Xeybəri, and Səfalı.

References 

Populated places in Shamakhi District